Springfield Township is one of the twenty-five townships of Muskingum County, Ohio, United States.  The 2000 census found 5,433 people in the township, 3,562 of whom lived in the unincorporated portions of the township.

Geography
Located in the southwestern part of the county, it borders the following townships:
Falls Township - north
Washington Township - northeast corner
Wayne Township - east
Brush Creek Township - southeast
Newton Township - southwest
Hopewell Township - northwest

Two municipalities are located in Springfield Township: the village of South Zanesville in the southwest, and part of the city of Zanesville, the county seat of Muskingum County, in the northeast.

Name and history
It is one of eleven Springfield Townships statewide.

Government
The township is governed by a three-member board of trustees, who are elected in November of odd-numbered years to a four-year term beginning on the following January 1. Two are elected in the year after the presidential election and one is elected in the year before it. There is also an elected township fiscal officer, who serves a four-year term beginning on April 1 of the year after the election, which is held in November of the year before the presidential election. Vacancies in the fiscal officership or on the board of trustees are filled by the remaining trustees.

References

External links
County website

Townships in Muskingum County, Ohio
Townships in Ohio